Dualist is the second studio album by the Filipino indie rock band Taken by Cars, released in 2011 by Party Bear Records.

Reception

Dualist was more favorably received by both critics and fans compared to their first album Endings of A New Kind, which received moderate to positive reviews.

Track listing
"This is Our City" – 3:35
"Unidentified" – 2:52
"34" – 3:55
"Quarter to Three" – 3:27
"Matter of Fact" – 5:03
"Considerate" – 4:05
"Autopilot" – 3:11
"Thrones: Indifference" – 3:29
"Thrones: Equals" – 4:16
"Intermission" – 6:11
"Sea Bass" – 3:57

References

2011 albums
Taken by Cars albums